Hakan Utangaç (born 1965 in Istanbul) is the guitarist of heavy metal band Mezarkabul (known as Pentagram in Turkey). He is a founding member of the band.

References

1965 births
Living people
Musicians from Istanbul
Turkish heavy metal guitarists
Turkish heavy metal singers
Turkish rock guitarists
Date of birth missing (living people)